Koptelovo is the name of several rural localities in Russia:
Koptelovo (selo), Sverdlovsk Oblast, a selo in Alapayevsky District of Sverdlovsk Oblast
Koptelovo (settlement), Sverdlovsk Oblast, a settlement in Alapayevsky District of Sverdlovsk Oblast
Koptelovo, Vologda Oblast, a village in Chuprinsky Selsoviet of Kaduysky District of Vologda Oblast